The 1999 Macau Grand Prix Formula Three was the 46th Macau Grand Prix race to be held on the streets of Macau on 21 November 1999. It was the sixteenth edition for Formula Three cars.

Entry list

Overall Race Results (Top 20)

References

External links
 The official website of the Macau Grand Prix

Macau Grand Prix
Grand
Macau
Macau